Aurora Fochesato (born 1 January 2006) is an Italian female professional darts player who currently plays in the World Darts Federation (WDF) and Professional Darts Corporation (PDC) events. She is a first gold medalist from Italy in the World Darts Federation international tournament.

Career
Aurora's career in darts began in 2017, when she started to participate in local darts tournaments in Italy. In 2021, she reached the final of Malta Open, but was defeated 4–5 to Paula Jacklin in a last-leg decider. In 2022, she took a part in the WDF Europe Cup Youth, where she defeated Amy Evans 5–1 and won a gold medal in singles girls competition. In pairs competition with Elisa Bolzicco, she achieved bronze medal, lost 1–3 in semi-finals match to eventual champions Tamara Kovács and Krisztina Turai from Hungary.

Performance timeline

References

External links
 
 Aurora Fochesato's profile
 Aurora Fochesato - Mastercaller

Living people
2006 births
Italian darts players
Professional Darts Corporation women's players